Helen Flanders may refer to:
Helen Hartness Flanders (1890–1972), American folklorist and ballad collector
Helen Flanders Dunbar (1902–1959), American psychiatrist